Jaime Aarón Munguía Escobedo (born 6 October 1996) is a Mexican professional boxer. He held the WBO junior middleweight title from 2018 to 2019. As of June 2022, Munguía  is ranked as the world's fourth best active  middleweight by BoxRec, The Ring magazine and ESPN,
and fifth by the Transnational Boxing Rankings Board. Munguía's knockout-to-win ratio stands at 80%.

Professional career

WBO light middleweight champion

Munguía vs. Ali 

Munguía turned professional in 2013 and compiled a record of 28-0 before challenging and beating American Sadam Ali on 12 May 2018 for the WBO junior middleweight title.

Munguía vs. Smith 
In his first defense on 21 July 2018, Munguía scored a unanimous decision victory over former light middleweight champion Liam Smith, with scores of 119-108, 117-110 and 116-111. Munguía had knocked Smith down in the sixth round.

Munguía vs. Cook
Munguía scored a third-round technical knockout victory against Brandon Cook on the undercard of Canelo Álvarez vs Gennady Golovkin II on 15 September 2018 for another successful defense of his world title.

Munguía vs. Hogan 
On 13 April 2019, Munguía returned to defend his title against mandatory challenger Dennis Hogan. Munguía won by controversial majority decision.

Munguía vs. Allotey
Munguía made the fifth defense of his WBO light middleweight title when he defeated Patrick Allotey by fourth-round technical knockout on 14 September 2019 in Carson, California.

Middleweight

Munguía vs. O'Sullivan 
Following Munguía's victory against Patrick Allotey, he vacated his WBO light middleweight title as he moved up to middleweight to face Gary O'Sullivan on 11 January 2020. Munguía won his middleweight debut via eleventh-round technical knockout.

Munguía vs. Johnson 
In his second bout at middleweight, Munguía faced Tureano Johnson on 30 October 2020. In the sixth round of the fight, Munguía landed a right uppercut which caused a nasty gash in Johnson's lip. This caused a doctor's stoppage, giving Munguía the victory and the WBO Inter-Continental middleweight title. After the fight, he made clear his desire to win a world title at middleweight, saying "I want any of the 160-pound champs. Any [of them] would be great for me."

Munguía vs. Szeremeta 
On 19 June 2021, Munguía faced former world title challenger Kamil Szeremeta who had taken the fight on short notice. Munguía won the fight via sixth-round corner retirement. Now ranked number 1 by the WBC and WBO, he said, “I would like to [fight for a world title] by the end of the year. If not, a battle between Mexico and Puerto Rico with Gabriel Rosado [who had knocked out Bektemir Melikuziev on the undercard], he looked really good tonight.”

Munguía vs. Rosado 
Munguía was scheduled to make his first WBO Inter-Continental middleweight title defense against the 41-fight veteran Gabriel Rosado on November 13, 2021, at the Honda Center in Anaheim, California. Munguía entered the fight as the significant betting favorite, with most odds-makers having him -700 or -750 betting favorite. Munguía won the fight by unanimous decision, with scores of 118-110, 119-109 and 117-111. He landed 328 total punches to Rosado's 154, and successfully connected with 50% of his power shots.

Munguía vs. Kelly 
Munguía faced Jimmy Kelly at the Honda Center in Anaheim, California scoring  three knockdowns before the referee stopped the bout in round five. At the immediate post-fight interview, Munguía called out Jermall Charlo seeking a world title.

Professional boxing record

See also
List of world light-middleweight boxing champions
List of Mexican boxing world champions

References

External links

1996 births
Living people
Mexican male boxers
Boxers from Baja California
Sportspeople from Tijuana
Light-middleweight boxers
World light-middleweight boxing champions
World Boxing Organization champions